RAF Yatesbury is a former Royal Air Force airfield near the village of Yatesbury, Wiltshire, England, about  east of the town of Calne. It was an important training establishment in the First and Second World Wars, and until its closure in 1965. For a time in the 1950s, part of the site became RAF Cherhill.

First World War
The Royal Flying Corps began pilot training at Yatesbury in 1916. Formations included No. 99 Squadron, and No. 7 and No. 8 squadrons of the Australian Flying Corps.

The aerodrome's site was farmland on the north side of the A4 road, south of Yatesbury village. There were two airfields, East Camp and West Camp, each with buildings and hangars. Two target areas were marked out. Training continued until 1919, then squadrons were sent to Yatesbury to be disbanded. The station closed in 1920 and returned to farmland.

The following units were here at some date before the inter-war years:

Second World War
From 1936 the Bristol Aeroplane Company operated part of the west site as a civilian flying school (No. 10 Elementary and Reserve Flying Training School RAF) where trainees were prepared for service in the RAF or the Reserve, using de Havilland Tiger Moth aircraft.

Guy Gibson, leader of the famous "Dambusters" raid (Operation Chastise) of 1943, took his ab initio training here from November 1936 to January 1937.

In 1939 the Air Ministry took over the whole site and pilot training was transferred elsewhere so that the station could be used (together with nearby RAF Compton Bassett) to train many airborne wireless operators. In 1940 it was placed under No. 60 Group RAF. From 1942, radar operators were trained there.

East Camp housed the No. 2 Electrical and Wireless School RAF, later renamed No. 2 Radio School RAF, where among the instructors was Arthur C. Clarke, later a science fiction author and inventor. Radar training was at No. 9 Radio School RAF. An estimated 70 died flying from Yatesbury, including aircrew from Australia, Canada, Czechoslovakia, Poland, Russia, South Africa, and the United States. 21 are buried in the All Saints' parish churchyard in Yatesbury.

After the war, flying training resumed from 1945 to 1947.

Cold War
During the Cold War in the 1950s, training of radar operators, mechanics and fitters continued at East Camp. From 1954 to 1958 the site became RAF Cherhill, 27 Group Headquarters, Technical Training Command.

Demand for training reduced after the winding-down of National Service from 1961. The site closed in 1965, with the Radar and Wireless training school transferring to RAF Locking. In 1969 the wooden huts were demolished and the land returned again to farming, leaving only a number of brick-built buildings, including the Officers' Mess, the gymnasium and three hangars.

Present
Since 1987 the two groups of hangars built in 1916 have been Grade II* listed. In 1989 the former Officers' Mess and offices, built in 1936, were listed Grade II. In 1998 North Wiltshire District Council designated Yatesbury Aerodrome a Conservation Area.

The airfield is now farmland. Surviving hangars and other buildings can be seen from the A4. Proposals were made in 2004 and again in 2014 to develop the sites of the buildings for housing. By 2008 the three hangars were on the Heritage At Risk register. The condition of one deteriorated and permission to demolish it was given in 2012. The other two remained At Risk in 2015.

The Wiltshire Microlight Centre uses part of the site.

In popular culture
The video to the 1988 No.1 hit song "Doctorin' the Tardis" by The Timelords, better known as The KLF, was partly filmed there.

Units
The following units were here at some point from the inter-war years:

References

Citations

Bibliography

External links

 

Royal Air Force stations in Wiltshire
Royal Air Force stations of World War II in the United Kingdom
Royal Air Force stations of World War I in the United Kingdom
Defunct airports in England